Patagonia Lake State Park is a state park of Arizona, US, containing Patagonia Lake.   The ,  lake located near Patagonia, Arizona, is a popular southern Arizona site for fishing, camping, boat rental, picnicking, hiking, and birding.  Located inside the park is the recently established Sonoita Creek State Natural Area, Arizona's first major state natural area.  Created by the damming of Sonoita Creek, the lake is habitat for reproducing largemouth bass, black crappie, bluegill, green sunfish, flathead catfish, threadfin shad, redear sunfish, channel catfish, and American bullfrogs.  Rainbow trout are stocked every three weeks from October to March.  Sonoita Creek contains black bullhead, red shiner, mosquitofish, crayfish, American bullfrogs, largemouth bass, Gila topminnows, speckled dace, longfin dace, Sonora suckers, and desert suckers.  Special events include an annual mariachi festival in March and bird tours and interpretive programs on request.

References

External links

 Patagonia Lake State Park

1974 establishments in Arizona
Parks in Santa Cruz County, Arizona
Protected areas established in 1974
State parks of Arizona